Cheikh Bamba "C.B." Diallo (born 28 March 1990) is a Senegalese basketball player for Jeanne d'Arc of the NM1 and the Senegal national .

Early career
Born in Thiès, Diallo played with the SEED Academy from age 16. In 2013, he played at a Basketball Without Borders camp in South Africa and was named the All-Star Game MVP. He moved to the United States to play high school basketball in North Carolina with Cape Fear Christian Academy.

College career
Diallo played two seasons with Kilgore College from 2015 until 2017. He averaged 24 minutes, 9.6 points and 2.2 rebounds in 59 games with Kilgore. In 2017, he transferred to the American Eagles men's basketball team.

Professional career
In May 2021, Diallo signed with Senegalese side AS Douanes. He was on the roster for the first-ever season of the Basketball Africa League (BAL). Diallo helped the Douanes win the Senegalese Cup in October, and was named the MVP after scoring 22 points in the final against Jeanne d'Arc.

In November 2021, Diallo signed with DUC Dakar of the Nationale 1 and for the 2022 BAL season. On 16 March 2022, Diallo scored a BAL career-high 30 points in a loss to AS Salé.

After the 2022 season, in which DUC won the Senegalese Cup, Diallo signed with rivals Jeanne d'Arc.

National team career
In 2021, Diallo was called up for the Senegalese national basketball team and made his debut against  in February. He also played at FIBA AfroBasket 2021, contributing 5.3 points per game for Senegal on its way to a bronze medal.

BAL career statistics

|-
| style="text-align:left;"|2021
| style="text-align:left;"|AS Douanes
| 4 || 0 || 20.7 || .410 || .435 || .833 || 3.0 || 1.0 || 1.8 || 0.0 || 11.8
|-
| style="text-align:left;"|2022
| style="text-align:left;"|DUC
| 5 || 5 || 30.6 ||  .448 || .375 || .900 || 1.8 || 1.0 || 0.8 || 0.2 || 15.2
|-
|- class="sortbottom"
| style="text-align:center;" colspan="2"|Career
| 9 || 5 || 26.2 || .431 || .402 || .870 || 2.3 || 1.0 || 1.2 || 0.1 || 13.7

Awards and accomplishments

Club career
AS Douanes
Senegalese Cup winner: (2021)
DUC Dakar

 Senegalese Cup winner: (2022)

 Dakar Municipal Cup winner: (2022)

National team career
Senegal
AfroBasket  Bronze Medal: (2021)

Individual awards
Senegalese Cup MVP: (2021)

References

External links

1996 births
DUC Dakar players
Living people
American Eagles men's basketball players
Senegalese men's basketball players
Shooting guards
People from Thiès
AS Douanes basketball players
Senegalese expatriate basketball people in the United States
ASC Jeanne d'Arc basketball players